The Nanjing–Xi'an railway or Ningxi railway, is a major trunkline railroad in China between Nanjing, the capital of Jiangsu Province and Xi'an, the capital of Shaanxi Province. The Chinese name for the line, Ningxi, is named after the two terminal cities, Ning, the Chinese character shorthand for the city of Nanjing, and Xi for Xian. In addition, a connection line  in length was built in 2004 between the main line in Sui County and the Hankou–Danjiangkou railway in northern Hubei. The Ningxi railway passes through five provinces in central and eastern China. Major cities along route include Nanjing and Pukou in Jiangsu Province; Feidong, Hefei and Lu'an in Anhui Province; Huangchuan, Xinyang, Nanyang and Xixia County in Henan Province and Shangluo, Weinan and Xian in Shaanxi Province. The main line skirts Hubei Province near Sui County.

Since the completion of Shanghai-Wuhan-Chengdu Corridor, of which Hefei-Nanjing section of this line is a part, the remaining part of this line is often called "Hefei-Xi'an Railway".

History
Planning of the Nanjing-Xian railway began in early 1990s to bring railway service to a 400–500 km void in China's railway network between the Longhai railway to the north and Xiangyu and Handan railways to the south.  Construction began in 2000 and the Xi'an-Hefei section of the line entered into operation on January 7, 2004.  The high-speed, double-track Hefei-Nanjing section, also known as the Hefei–Nanjing railway, which was built from 2005 to 2008, opened on April 18, 2008 and forms part of the Shanghai–Wuhan–Chengdu passenger railway. 

The construction of the second track of the Xi'an-Hefei section officially started in December 2012. The Shaanxi section opened on December 11, 2015, the Hubei section opened on December 15, 2015, and the Henan section and Anhui section opened on December 21, 2015.

The newly constructed double track uses continuously-welded track.

The line has been partly electrified. Electrification was completed between Nanjing and Yeji on 8 December 2015.

Railway junctions
The Ningxi railway is a major trunkline in China's railway network and connects with numerous other railway lines including:

Jiangsu Province
 Nanjing: Beijing–Shanghai railway, Nanjing–Tongling railway, Nanjing–Qidong railway, Shanghai–Nanjing intercity railway

Anhui Province
 Hefei: Hefei–Wuhan railway, Huainan railway

Henan Province
 Huangchuan: Beijing–Kowloon railway
 Xinyang: Beijing–Guangzhou railway

Hubei Province
 Sui County: Xiaolin–Lishan railway

Henan Province
 Nanyang: Jiaozuo–Liuzhou railway

Shaanxi Province
 Xi'an: Longhai railway, Xi'an–Ankang railway, Houma–Xi'an railway

See also

 List of railways in China

References

Railway lines in China
Rail transport in Shaanxi
Rail transport in Henan
Rail transport in Hubei
Rail transport in Anhui
Rail transport in Jiangsu
Railway lines opened in 2004